Synaphea polymorpha, commonly known as Albany synaphea, is a species of small shrub in the flowering plant family Proteaceae. It is endemic to Western Australia. The Noongar peoples know the plant as bindak.

It blooms between August and November producing yellow flowers. Found in woodlands on hillsides, low-lying areas and swamps in the Great Southern region of Western Australia where it grows in sandy or clay-sand lateritic soils.

The species was first formally described by the botanist Robert Brown in 1810 in the work On the natural order of plants called Proteaceae in the journal Transactions of the Linnean Society of London.

References

polymorpha
Proteales of Australia
Eudicots of Western Australia
Plants described in 1810